Erling Andersen (9 September 1901 – 9 January 1969) was a Norwegian footballer. He played in two matches for the Norway national football team in 1929.

References

External links
 

1901 births
1969 deaths
Norwegian footballers
Norway international footballers
Association football forwards
Mjøndalen IF players